Park Gyeong-ree (born July 5, 1990), better known mononymously as Gyeongree (Korean: 경리 sometimes romanised to Kyungri), is a South Korean singer, actress and model. She is a former member of the South Korean girl group 9Muses.

Biography and career
She was born on July 5 in 1990 in Busan. She completed her studies from Daemyung Girls High School. She signed with Medialine Entertainment in 2010. She worked as back dancer with singers such as Kim Gun-mo, Park Mi-kyung and Chae Yeon. She was a singer in Nine Muses. She also took interest in acting and did supporting roles in dramas Reply 1994, On the Way to the Airport and Real. Even though Nine Muses disbanded in 2019, she renewed her contract with Star Empire Entertainment and decided to pursue a solo career. However, as of July 31, 2019, Star Empire Entertainment announced that Gyeongree had decided not to renew her contract with Star Empire, thus leaving the company after seven years.

She moved to YNK Entertainment on January 6, 2020 and announced concentrating on acting with the change of her stage name to her full name on July 30, 2020.

Discography

Singles

Collaborations

Filmography

Television

Film

Hosting

Music video appearances

Awards and nominations 
2018 MBC Entertainment Awards: Nominated for Music and Talk category	
2019 MBC Entertainment Awards: Nominated for Women's Excellence Prize in Music Talk

Footnotes

References

External links 
 
 

Living people
21st-century South Korean actresses
South Korean female models
South Korean television actresses
1990 births
South Korean women singers
South Korean film actresses
South Korean female idols